Kudal is a census town in Sindhudurg district, Maharashtra, India. It is situated on River Karli in southwest Maharashtara. Kudal is the fourth largest town in Sindhudurg after Sawantwadi, Malvan and Kankavli. As of 2011, the population is 16,015. Kudal supports one MIDC area in the Konkan division. The Kudal railway station is located on the Konkan Railway route and connects the town with Mumbai (Bombay) metro situated in the Bombay, Baroda and Central India Railway of the north, and Mangalore on the south. It is a major stop for the Konkan Railway with many trains having a halt. The Deccan Odyssey train also stops in Kudal. National Highway 66 passes through Kudal. Apart from that, it also has two bus stations, a new one and old one. The old one is situated in market while the new one is just adjacent to the NH-66. Kudal is situated in centre of the Sindhudurg district and also considered one of the fastest-growing towns in the Konkan region.
The Desai's were the original rulers of Kudal, who were tributaries of the Bijapur Sultanate, later the Marathas and then under the British.

Prominence

The town is considered one of the most antique settlements of the Konkan Region. It is also has market for Alphonso (Hapus) Mango, which is exported to different cities in the India and also different countries all over the world. The town is also renowned for the annual fair (Jatra), which is organized at the Kudaleshwar temple. There are a number of attractions that lure a large number of people every year from all across the country. Some of the prominent attractions in the town include the Rangana Garh Fort, Shree Devi Laxmi Mandir, Deo Dongar Machhindranath Mandir, Shree Dev Bhairav Temple, Sateri devi mandir, The Shree Maruti Mandir, Shree Devi Bhavani Mandir, Shree Devi Kelbai Mandir, Ghodebao, College of Horticulture Mulde - Dr. Balasaheb Sawant Konkan Krishi Vidyapeeth in Mulde. This taluka also has a big village named Nerur which is a big tourist attraction. Here the biggest annual fair of shri dev kaleswar which is the temple of the greatest Lord Shiva. It is believed that the temple is the one of the origin of Lord Shiva. Nerur has lakes temples like shri laxmi narayan shri devi mauli and many more "Sant Rawool Maharaj Mahavidyalya Kudal".

Geography
The climate is mostly coastal and humid.

Demographics
 India census, Kudal city had a population of 16,015 people. Males constitute 51% of the population and females 49%. Kudal has an average literacy rate of 78%, which is higher than the national average of 59.5%. Male literacy is 81%, and female literacy is 75%. In Kudal, 12% of the population is under 6 years of age.

Transport

Kudal lies on the NH-66 from where coastal hamlets of Malvan and Tarkarli are accessible.

Kudal Railway station offers a convenient access point to visit the beach getaways of Malvan and Tarkarli (both ).

Nearest Airport -Sindhudurg Airport() Dabolim, Belgaum, Hubli (.

Kudal is connected by Day train with Mumbai.
Kudal is connected by Overnight train with Mumbai, Cochin (Ernakulam), Ahmedabad, New Delhi.
Kudal is connected by Day bus with Mumbai, Pune, Ahmedabad.
Kudal is connected by Overnight Bus with Mumbai, Pune, Ahmedabad.
Kudal is connected by Goa-Mumbai highway.
kudal is in Maharashtra state. It is connected to Mumbai-Goa Highway.
Kudal is accessible by road.

References

Talukas in Maharashtra
Cities and towns in Sindhudurg district